Sir Derman Guy Christopherson  (6 September 1915 – 7 November 2000) was a British engineering science academic.

Early life and education

Christopherson was born the son of a clergyman, Derman Christopherson (the vicar of Plumstead in southeast London), and Edith Frances Christopherson. Soon afterwards, the Christopherson family moved to Porlock in Devon, where his father was vicar of Clovelly. As a boy, Christopherson suffered from asthma. He was educated privately until, at age 14, he was sent to Sherborne School in Dorset.

He gained a scholarship at University College, Oxford, initially to read Mathematics. Later, in 1937, he achieved a first class degree in Engineering Science. The following year he went to Harvard University in the United States as a Henry Fellow, gaining an SM master's degree in 1938.

He returned to Oxford University as a research assistant to Sir Richard Southwell FRS, working on numerical methods for applied mechanics. He contributed to Southwell's relaxation method. 

Christopherson was the first to apply the method in the solution of field differential equations, which later became the most important application. He gained his DPhil in 1941.

War service
In 1941, during World War II, Christopherson was appointed as a Scientific Officer in the Ministry of Home Security, working in the research and experimental department with Sir Reginald Stradling. His work involved investigating the effects of explosives on buildings, shelters, and firefighting.  He worked with Solly (later Lord) Zuckerman and Hugh (later Sir Hugh) Cairns on researching helmet designs.  He was also with Barnes Wallis and his team during the war.

Academic career
Most of Christopherson's research was conducted at the University of Oxford (1937–41), the University of Cambridge (1945–49), and the University of Leeds (1949–55). He contributed to lubrication research especially. He was a lecturer in engineering at Cambridge. Christopherson was then appointed Professor of Mechanical Engineering at Leeds and became the head of the department in 1949. He left Leeds to become Professor of Applied Science with special reference to Engineering at Imperial College, London until 1960.

Christopherson was Vice-Chancellor and Warden of the University of Durham (1960–1979) and then Master of Magdalene College, Cambridge (1978–1985). In 1983 he became the second Chairman of the Standing Committee on Structural Safety, succeeding Lord Penney. He served as such until 1988.

Honours
Christopherson was elected a Fellow of the Royal Society (FRS) in 1960. He was also a Fellow of the Royal Academy of Engineering.

Marriage and children

Christopherson married Frances Edith Tearle in 1940; the couple had five children. Their son, Peter Christopherson (1955-2010), was a musician, video director and designer. Lady Christopherson predeceased her husband in 1988.

Death
Christopherson died on 7 November 2000, aged 85.  He was interred with his wife at the Parish of the Ascension Burial Ground, Cambridge.

Selected publications
 On being a technologist. London: S.C.M. Press, 1959.
 The University at Work. London: S.C.M. Press, 1973. Published for the University Teachers' Group; .

External links

References 

1915 births
2000 deaths
People from Plumstead
People educated at Sherborne School
Alumni of University College, Oxford
Harvard School of Engineering and Applied Sciences alumni
English mechanical engineers
Engineering academics
Academics of the University of Oxford
Academics of the University of Leeds
Academics of Imperial College London
Fellows of the Royal Society
Fellows of the Royal Academy of Engineering
Officers of the Order of the British Empire
Knights Bachelor
Masters of Magdalene College, Cambridge
Vice-Chancellors and Wardens of Durham University
Presidents of the Association for Science Education
20th-century British engineers